Stevie Wonder's Original Musiquarium I is a compilation album by R&B/soul musician Stevie Wonder that was released in 1982 by Tamla Records. It collects eleven Top 40 hit singles and five album tracks, including four previously unreleased tracks, from 1972 to 1982. The album peaked at No. 4 on the Billboard 200, at No. 1 on the Top R&B Albums chart in the U.S., and went to No. 8 in the UK. It has been certified gold by the RIAA. The four new songs were issued as singles to promote the album, with "That Girl" and "Do I Do" reaching the top 10 and top 20 of the US pop chart and number one and two on the R&B chart, respectively.

Content
Eleven previously released tracks were taken as singles from their respective albums, with "Higher Ground" and "Master Blaster (Jammin')" released before the LP. "Isn't She Lovely" was not released as a single from Songs in the Key of Life, while "Superstition", "You Are the Sunshine of My Life", "You Haven't Done Nothin'", "I Wish", and "Sir Duke" all topped the Billboard Hot 100. "Living for the City" and "Boogie On Reggae Woman" appear in slightly different versions to those on their albums, and "You Are the Sunshine of My Life" is the single mix with the horns added.

The double album covers Wonder's "classic period" running from 1972 to 1980, compiling tracks that appeared on every album from Music of My Mind through Hotter Than July. It also included four new songs, each tagged on as the last track on each album side: "Front Line"; "Ribbon in the Sky"; "That Girl"; and "Do I Do". The latter track features a solo by bebop innovator Dizzy Gillespie.

Track listing
All songs written by Stevie Wonder except "Front Line" by Wonder and Gary Byrd.

Charting history

Weekly charts

Year-end charts

Certifications

See also
List of number-one R&B albums of 1982 (U.S.)

References

1982 greatest hits albums
Stevie Wonder compilation albums
Albums produced by Stevie Wonder
Tamla Records compilation albums